Eleanor Maud Blackmore (17 April 1873 – 24 August 1943) was an English missionary supported by the Woman's American Baptist Home Mission Society.  She helped to establish the first Baptist church and schools in Nicaragua.

Early life 
Blackmore born in Havant, near Portsmouth, the daughter of William Blackmore and Maria Blackmore. She trained as a nurse while studying at the Baptist Deaconess Home in Chester.

Career 
Blackmore was already working in Central America by 1902, when she went to Costa Rica to assist during a yellow fever outbreak, and nearly died when she contracted the illness herself. She was commissioned in 1916 as the first general missionary in Nicaragua supported by the Woman's American Baptist Home Mission Society. She began a school in Managua.  In 1917 she and José S. Mendoza opened the First Baptist Church of Managua. She helped to lead revival meetings throughout Nicaragua in 1924, with pastors Harry Strachan (father of missionary Robert Kenneth Strachan) and Roberto Valenzuela Elphick of Chile. Her reports from the field often described intense opposition from Roman Catholic leaders and their parishioners, noting, "I am not a pessimist or I would not have stuck at this field for 26 years."

Blackmore attended an international missionary meeting in Edinburgh, Scotland, in 1910. In 1920, she spoke at a convention in Pittsburgh, Pennsylvania. Blackmore retired from the mission field in 1938, and returned to England.

Personal life and legacy 
Blackmore died in Wellington, Somerset, in 1943, aged 70 years. Universidad Politécnica de Nicaragua traces its origins in part to Blackmore's co-educational 1917 school.

References

External links 

 "La misteriosa Srita. Eleanore M. Blackmore: Pinceladas históricas de la relación entre las iglesias bautista y centroamericana" Camino al centenario CBN: Blog Oficial de la Convención Bautista de Nicaragua (CBN)(30 May 2016); a long blog post about Blackmore and her colleagues (in Spanish)
 Hayne, Coe, By-paths to forgotten folks; stories of real life in Baptist home mission fields (1921); a Christian education book about missionaries, including "A Pioneer in Peril" and "Reenforcements", chapters about Blackmore

1873 births
1943 deaths
People from Havant
Baptist missionaries
British missionaries